Eva-Charlotte Malmström (born 18 January 1948) is a Swedish sprinter. She competed in the women's 4 × 400 metres relay at the 1972 Summer Olympics.

References

1948 births
Living people
Athletes (track and field) at the 1972 Summer Olympics
Swedish female sprinters
Olympic athletes of Sweden
Place of birth missing (living people)
Olympic female sprinters